Bapunagar is one of the 182 Legislative Assembly constituencies of Gujarat state in India. It is part of Ahmedabad district and a segment of Ahmedabad East Lok Sabha constituency.

List of segments

This assembly seat represents the following segments,

 Ahmedabad City Taluka (Part) – Ahmedabad Municipal Corporation (Part) Ward No. – 21, 28, 29.

Members of the Legislative Assembly

Election results

2022

2017

2012

References

External links
 

Assembly constituencies of Gujarat
Ahmedabad district